Claysville is an unincorporated community in Boone County, in the U.S. state of Missouri. It is the southernmost settlement in Boone County. Claysville is near the Missouri River.

History
Claysville was laid out in 1844, and named after Henry Clay, the Kentucky statesman.  A post office called Claysville was established in 1850, and remained in operation until 1908.

References

Unincorporated communities in Boone County, Missouri
Unincorporated communities in Missouri